Aegiceras corniculatum, commonly known as black mangrove, river mangrove, goat's horn mangrove, or khalsi, is a species of shrub or tree mangrove in the primrose family, Primulaceae, with a distribution in coastal and estuarine areas ranging from India through South East Asia to southern China, New Guinea and Australia.

Description
It grows in mud in estuaries and tidal creeks, often at the seaward edge of the mangrove zone.

The species is of interest to many moths, including species from the genera Anarsia, Archips and Phyllocnistis, as well as the species Darna trima, Gonodontis clelia and Neurozerra conferta.

Medicinal uses
Aegiceras corniculatum extract has analgesic properties which supports a fight against diabetes. The stems of the plant contain up to seven compounds, including: 2-methoxy-3-nonylresorcinol, 5-O-ethylembelin, 2-O-acetyl-5-O-methylembelin, 3,7-dihydroxy-2,5-diundecylnaphthoquinone, 2,7-dihydroxy-8-methoxy-3,6-diundecyldibenzofuran-1,4-dione, 2,8-dihydroxy-7-methoxy-3,9-diundecyldibenzofuran-1,4-dione (6), and 10-hydroxy-4-O-methyl-2,11-diundecylgomphilactone.

References

External links

Primulaceae
Flora of New South Wales
Flora of Queensland
Eudicots of Western Australia
Flora of the Northern Territory
Mangroves
Taxa named by Carl Linnaeus
Taxa named by Francisco Manuel Blanco
Central Indo-Pacific flora